is a railway station on the Tobu Tojo Line in Tokyo, Japan, operated by the private railway operator Tobu Railway.

Lines
Only "Local" (all-stations) services stop at this station, with eight trains per hour in each direction during the daytime.

Station layout
The station consists of two side platforms serving two tracks. The station has three entrances: the south and east entrances adjoining platform 1, and the north entrance adjoining platform 2. Access between the platforms is provided by a footbridge at the west (down) end of the platforms and also be a separate footbridge with lift access. Toilet facilities are provided on both platforms.

Platforms

History
The station opened on 25 August 1931.

From 17 March 2012, station numbering was introduced on the Tobu Tojo Line, with Ōyama Station becoming "TJ-04".

Future plans 
On 28 July 2022, a grade separation project will result in the facilities being transitioned to a new elevated station structure. The project, which aims to elevate  of the Tobu Tojo Line, is expected to cost  and is expected to be completed by 2030. This will also result in the elimination of eight level crossings.

Passenger statistics
In fiscal 2010, the station was used by an average of 46,727 passengers daily.

Surrounding area
 Itabashi-kuyakushomae Station ( Toei Mita Line, 10 minutes' walk)

See also
 List of railway stations in Japan

References

External links

 Ōyama Station information 

Tobu Tojo Main Line
Stations of Tobu Railway
Railway stations in Tokyo
Railway stations in Japan opened in 1931